Mariano Felipe Paz Soldán y Ureta (August 22, 1821 - December 31, 1886), Peruvian historian and geographer, was born in Arequipa, Peru. He was Minister of Justice and Instruction and Minister of Foreign Relations.

Education and early career
Paz Soldán was the son of Manuel Paz Soldán and Gregoria de Ureta Araníbar and was educated at Seminary of San Jerónimo and University of San Agustín, where he obtained a degree in Law. He had three brothers Mateo, José Gregorio and Pedro.

He studied law and, after holding some minor judicial offices, was minister to New Granada in 1853. After his return, he occupied himself with plans for the establishment of a model penitentiary at Lima, which he was enabled to accomplish through the support of General Ramon Castilla. In 1860, Castilla made him director of public works, in which capacity he superintended the erection of the Lima statue of Simón Bolívar. He was also concerned in the reform of the currency by the withdrawal of the debased Bolivian coins.

Atlas, History, and Geographical Dictionary

Great atlas
In 1861, he published his great atlas of the republic of Peru, and, in 1868, the first volume of his history of Peru after the acquisition of her independence. A second volume followed, and a third, bringing the history down to 1839, was published after his death by his son.

Geographical Dictionary of Peru
In 1870, he was minister of justice and worship under President José Balta, but shortly afterwards retired from public life.  He edited his brother Mateo's great geographical dictionary of Peru, which was published in 1877. During the disastrous war with Chile, he sought refuge in Buenos Aires where he was made professor in the Colegio Nacional de Buenos Aires and where he wrote and published a history of the war (1884). He died on December 31, 1886.

Publications 
 Índice alfabético del Código Civil y de Enjuiciamientos y de Reglamento de Tribunales (1853)
 Geografía del Perú (1860)
 Atlas Geográfico del Perú (1865)
 Diccionario geográfico del Perú (1877)
 Historia del Perú independiente 1819-1827 (1868)
 Biblioteca Peruana (1879)
 Narración histórica de la guerra de Chile contra Perú y Bolivia (1883)

See also 

 Beagle Channel cartography since 1881

Notes

References

 Maps, Drawings and photos of M. Paz Soldán David Rumpsey Map Collection

1821 births
1886 deaths
People from Arequipa
19th-century Peruvian historians
Peruvian male writers
Historians of Peru
19th-century male writers